The Speed skating events have been contested at the Universiade since 1968. The sport have a special status at the event, because the host cities are not expected to build a speed skating rink specifically for the Universiade. In years where the Winter Universiade doesn't take place, or doesn't include speed skating, the World University Speed Skating Championships are sometimes held instead.

Events

Medalists

Men

100 m

500 m

1000 m

1500 m

3000 m

5000 m

10000 m

Mass start

Team pursuit

Women

100 m

500 m

1000 m

1500 m

3000 m

5000 m

Mass start

Team pursuit

Mixed

Mixed relay

Medal table 
Last updated after the 2017 Winter Universiade

References 
 Sports123
 Speed Skating FISU
 

 
Sports at the Winter Universiade
Universiade
International speed skating competitions